Wildseed is a mobile software company based in the United States. It was acquired by AOL on August 7, 2005.

References

Defunct software companies of the United States